Maria Grazia Pagano (5 November 1945 – 17 September 2022) was an Italian teacher and politician. A member of the Democratic Party of the Left and later the Democrats of the Left, she served in the Senate of the Republic from 1992 to 2006 and in the European Parliament from 2008 to 2009.

Pagano died in Rome on 17 September 2022, at the age of 76.

References

1945 births
2022 deaths
Italian politicians
Senators of Legislature XI of Italy
Senators of Legislature XII of Italy
Senators of Legislature XIII of Italy
Senators of Legislature XIV of Italy
MEPs for Italy 2004–2009
Italian Communist Party politicians
Democratic Party of the Left politicians
Democrats of the Left politicians
Democratic Party (Italy) politicians
Italia Viva politicians
University of Naples Federico II alumni
Politicians from Naples